The Orb is a  long river in the department of Hérault in the south of France. It flows into the Mediterranean Sea at Valras-Plage. The river flows through the towns of  Bédarieux and Béziers, where it is crossed by the canal du Midi on the Orb Aqueduct.

Geography 
The Orb flows through the following communes:
 Ceilhes-et-Rocozels
 Avène
 Le Bousquet-d'Orb
 La Tour-sur-Orb
 Bédarieux
 Hérépian
 Lamalou-les-Bains
 Le Poujol-sur-Orb
 Roquebrun
 Cessenon-sur-Orb
 Lignan-sur-Orb
 Béziers
 Sauvian
 Sérignan 
 Valras-Plage

Tributaries 
The following rivers flow into the Orb:
Jaur 
Lirou 
Mare 
Taurou 
Vernazobre 
Rieutort 
Héric

References

Rivers of France
Rivers of Occitania (administrative region)
Rivers of Hérault

0Orb